Commercial zone may refer to:

 Commercial area, an area zoned for commercial development
 Commercial zoning, the practice of designating an area for commercial development
 Commercial Zone, an album by Public Image Limited